The Commander of the PLA Ground Force is the commanding officer of the People's Liberation Army Ground Force. The current commander is General Liu Zhenli.

List of commanders

References

People's Liberation Army Ground Force
China